John Moss (7 February 1864 – 10 July 1950) was an English cricketer and umpire.  Moss was a right-handed batsman who bowled right-arm medium pace.  He was born at Clifton, Nottinghamshire.

Moss made a single first-class appearance for Nottinghamshire against the Marylebone Cricket Club at Lord's in 1892.  It was as an umpire that he was more prominently remembered, standing in 665 first-class matches between 1894 and 1932, which included eleven Test matches between 1902 and 1921, the majority of which were Ashes matches between England and Australia.

He died at Keyworth, Nottinghamshire on 10 July 1950.  His brother-in-law, John Butler, also played first-class cricket.

References

External links
John Moss at ESPNcricinfo
John Moss at CricketArchive

1864 births
1950 deaths
People from Clifton, Nottinghamshire
Cricketers from Nottinghamshire
English cricketers
Nottinghamshire cricketers
English Test cricket umpires
People from Keyworth